John Allen (born 24 April 1955) is an English former footballer who played for Hinckley Athletic, Leicester City, Port Vale, and Hinckley Athletic.

Career
Allen played for Hinckley Athletic and Leicester City, before joining Fourth Division side Port Vale in May 1980. He earned a first team place for the start of the 1980–81 season, and scored his first goal in the Football League on 20 September, in a 4–2 win over Darlington at Vale Park. He later claimed goals in home victories over Stockport County, Tranmere Rovers, and Southend United, but lost his place in November 1980 and was given a free transfer in April 1981 after making 18 league and two League Cup appearances for John McGrath's "Valiants".

Career statistics
Source:

References

1955 births
Living people
Footballers from Coventry
English footballers
Association football forwards
Hinckley United F.C. players
Leicester City F.C. players
Port Vale F.C. players
English Football League players